American singer Selena has recorded material for her five studio albums and has collaborated with other artists for duets and featured songs on their respective albums and charity singles. Her six indie label albums—Selena y Los Dinos (1984), Alpha (1986), Munequito de Trapo (1987), And the Winner Is... (1987), Preciosa (1988), and Dulce Amor (1988)—were released prior to signing a recording contract with EMI Latin, who billed Selena as a solo artist despite her Los Dinos band's involvement in her releases. Most of these songs were written by the singer's father and manager Abraham Quintanilla, Jr. and from local Tejano music songwriters. Selena's brother, A.B. Quintanilla became her principal record producer and songwriter by 1989, though he fought to remain in this position with the release of Selena's self-titled debut album with EMI Latin. The company insisted on a Grammy Award-winning songwriter for Selena, Abraham went into an agreement that if A.B. failed to produce a successful album they would then collectively be in favor of a Grammy Award-winning producer for her next recording. Selena spawned three singles; "Contigo Quiero Estar", "Mentiras", and a Spanish-language cover of Kyu Sakamoto's 1960s Japanese song "Sukiyaki". Her Los Dinos band—newcomers Pete Astudillo, Joe Ojeda, and veteran Ricky Vela—were involved in the writing process for Selena's debut album.

EMI Latin allowed A.B. to remain the singer's producer and songwriter for Ven Conmigo (1990) after her first recording enjoyed moderate success. Six out of the ten songs on the album were written by her band. Local songwriter Johnny Herrera contributed to three tracks, including "Aunque No Salga el Sol" which was originally intended for Lisa Lopez. Vela wanted Selena to record Juan Gabriel's "Yo Me Voy" after listening to Rocío Dúrcal's version of the song. "Baila Esta Cumbia", the second single released from Ven Conmigo, was written by A.B. and Astudillo following a concert in West Texas. In 1991, Selena recorded a duet with Salvadoran singer Alvaro Torres on "Buenos Amigos", a song he wrote after attending one of her concerts. Entre a Mi Mundo (1992), Selena's third studio album, were written entirely by her band. It included the band's most innovative sound, at the time. "¿Qué Creias?", an unapologetic mariachi "kiss-off anthem", was written by A.B. and Astudillo, who co-wrote as a pair on most of the recordings on the album. Selena was credited as co-writer for "Amame" and "Como la Flor", the latter became the singer's signature song. In Live! (1993), three out of the eleven songs were new studio recordings; "No Debes Jugar", "La Llamada", and "Tú Robaste Mi Corazón" (a duet with American singer Emilio Navaira), all of which were written by the band.

Selena was featured on the Barrio Boyzz 1994 single "Donde Quiera Que Estés", which was written by K. C. Porter, Miguel Flores, and Desmond Child. Finding it challenging to write another successful song following "Como la Flor", A.B. enlisted Vela and Astudillo with writing Amor Prohibido (1994); the singer's fourth studio album. Amor Prohibido is considered to be Selena's best work and her band's "crowning achievement". The album was supported with the title track "Amor Prohibido", "Bidi Bidi Bom Bom", "No Me Queda Más", and "Fotos y Recuerdos" as singles. The latter samples the Pretenders 1982 song "Back on the Chain Gang", while "Cobarde" was written by José Luis Borrego. On March 31, 1995, Selena was shot and killed by her friend and former manager of her boutiques. At the time of her death, Selena was working on a crossover into American pop music. Keith Thomas wrote "I Could Fall in Love", the lead single from her Dreaming of You (1995) album which were released posthumously. The titular track "Dreaming of You" was written by Franne Golde and Tom Snow, while Diane Warren wrote "I'm Getting Used to You" and Kit Hain wrote "Captive Heart". Selena's posthumous output includes the releases of the intended songs for the Don Juan DeMarco soundtrack: "Tú Sólo Tú" (a Pedro Infante cover), "El Toro Relajo", and "Siempre Hace Frio". The soundtrack album to the biopic film Selena, included songs written by her band, Norman Saleet, Pamela Phillips Oland, Frederick Perren, Dino Fekaris, Steve Greenberg, Paul Jabara, Van McCoy, Donna Summer, and Giorgio Moroder. Selena's charity effort, "A Boy Like That" was posthumously released to help raise funds for HIV/AIDS patients. "Con Tanto Amor Medley", a mash-up of "Como la Flor", "Amor Prohibido", and "Si Una Vez", was released as a single in 2002. Selena's last recording, "Puede Ser", was released in 2004 and is a duet with Nando "Guero" Dominguez, which was written by Selena's widower Chris Perez. , some songs recorded by Selena remain unreleased or were unofficially digitally released by her family.

Released songs

Unreleased Songs

See also 
 Selena singles discography
 Selena albums discography

Notes

References

Bibliography 

 
 
 
 
 
 
 
 
 
 
 
 
 
 
 
 
 
 
 
 
 
 
 
 
 
 
 
 
 
 
 
 
 
 
 
 
 
 

Recorded
Selena